The Exchange State Bank in Grand Meadow, Minnesota, United States, is a Prairie School style building that was built in 1910.  It was designed by architects Purcell & Elmslie.  It has also been known as the First American State Bank.  It was listed on the National Register of Historic Places in 1975.  

It is significant as the first major joint project of Purcell and Elmslie, and one of few commercial buildings by them.  William Gray Purcell designed the building and George Grant Elmslie created the ornamentation of terra cotta, glass mosaic and wood.  The building has been regarded as an "excellent" example of Prairie School architecture, implemented in brick.

See also
First State Bank of Le Roy, the third bank designed by Purcell and Elmslie

References

External links
 

Bank buildings on the National Register of Historic Places in Minnesota
Buildings and structures in Mower County, Minnesota
Commercial buildings completed in 1910
National Register of Historic Places in Mower County, Minnesota
Prairie School architecture in Minnesota
Purcell and Elmslie buildings